Best of the Worst is a television program that was hosted by Greg Kinnear and aired by Fox Broadcasting Company as a part of its 1991–92 schedule.

Overview
Best of the Worst, hosted by Greg Kinnear, was a lighthearted celebration of the worst elements of life—the worst movies, the worst places to get married, the worst museums, the worst airline food, and the worst Elvis impersonators being only a few of the "worst" examples.  There was even a special correspondent reporting from Japan, David Spector, apparently to prove that North America had no monopoly on life's worst things.

Memorable segments included a wacky “beat poet” duo who sang in gibberish, rent a witch, and a man who collected roadkill.

Cancellation
Due to its Nielsen ratings it was cancelled at midseason. It finished dead last out of 98 shows and only averaged a 4.42 rating.

References

Lost Media Wiki : The Best of the Worst

1991 American television series debuts
1992 American television series endings
1990s American television series
Fox Broadcasting Company original programming
Television series by The Wolper Organization
Television series by Lorimar Television
Television series by Telepictures